Kline is a town in Barnwell County, South Carolina, United States. The population was 197 at the 2010 census.

Geography
Kline is located in southern Barnwell County at  (33.124363, -81.343057). U.S. Route 278 passes through the center of the town, leading north  to Barnwell, the county seat, and south  to Allendale.

Demographics

At the 2000 census there were 238 people, 87 households, and 62 families living in the town. The population density was 76.6 people per square mile (29.5/km). There were 112 housing units at an average density of 36.1 per square mile (13.9/km).  The racial makeup of the town was 26.89% White, 57.56% African American, 14.71% from other races, and 0.84% from two or more races. Hispanic or Latino of any race were 18.49%.

Of the 87 households 34.5% had children under the age of 18 living with them, 39.1% were married couples living together, 19.5% had a female householder with no husband present, and 27.6% were non-families. 23.0% of households were one person and 14.9% were one person aged 65 or older. The average household size was 2.74 and the average family size was 3.22.

The age distribution was 29.0% under the age of 18, 7.1% from 18 to 24, 26.5% from 25 to 44, 21.0% from 45 to 64, and 16.4% 65 or older. The median age was 37 years. For every 100 females, there were 93.5 males. For every 100 females age 18 and over, there were 85.7 males.

The median household income was $14,821 and the median family income  was $22,083. Males had a median income of $30,179 versus $17,292 for females. The per capita income for the town was $10,045. About 36.6% of families and 45.9% of the population were below the poverty line, including 72.1% of those under the age of eighteen and 37.3% of those sixty five or over.

References

Towns in Barnwell County, South Carolina
Towns in South Carolina